In mathematics, Turing's method is used to verify that for any given Gram point  there lie m + 1 zeros of , in the region , where  is the Riemann zeta function. It was discovered by Alan Turing and published in 1953, although that proof contained errors and a correction was published in 1970 by R. Sherman Lehman.

For every integer i with  we find a list of Gram points  and a complementary list , where  is the smallest number such that 

where Z(t) is the Hardy Z function. Note that  may be negative or zero. Assuming that  and there exists some integer k such that , then if

and

References

1953 introductions
1953 in science
Alan Turing
Zeta and L-functions